Elephant Fury is a 1953 West German drama war film directed by and starring Harry Piel. It also features Herbert A.E. Bohme, Hans Zesch-Ballot and Dorothea Wieck. The film had a troubled production history. Originally made between 1940 and 1943 under the title of Panic, it faced censorship problems. Following the end of the Second World War Piel recovered the negative which had fallen into the hands of the occupying Soviet forces. He re-shot some scenes and the film was eventually released more than a decade after it had first begun shooting.

Synopsis
During the Second World War, an air raid on a zoo leads to the animals escaping across the city.

Cast
 Harry Piel as Großtierfänger Peter Volker
 Herbert A.E. Böhme as Mitarbeiter Fritz Kröger
 Hans Zesch-Ballot as Zoodirektor Thiele
 Dorothea Wieck as Hella Thiele
 Wilhelm P. Krüger as Farmer A. R. Brinkmann
 Ruth Eweler as Christa Brinkmann
 Fritz Hoopts as Farmer H. Sander
 Maria Krahn as Farmerin Küppers
 Julius Riedmueller as Affenwärter Alois Leitner
 Julius Frey as Elefantenwärter F. Müller
 L. Krüger-Roger as Raubtierwärter J. Huber
 Beppo Brem as Tiergartenbesucher während eines Fliegerangriffs
 Peter Strunk as Tierwärter Becker
 Karl Hellmer
 Maria Hofen
 Eva Klein-Donath
 Joe Münch-Harris
 Albert Parsen
 Karl-Heinz Peters
 Rudolf Vogel

References

Bibliography 
 Rentschler, Eric. The Ministry of Illusion: Nazi Cinema and Its Afterlife. Harvard University Press, 1996.

External links 
 

1943 films
1953 films
German war drama films
West German films
1950s German-language films
Films directed by Harry Piel
World War II films made in wartime
Films set on the home front during World War II
Films set in zoos
German black-and-white films
1940s war drama films
1950s war drama films
1943 drama films
1953 drama films
1950s German films
1930s German films